Denisophytum is a genus of flowering plants in the family Fabaceae. It belongs to the subfamily Caesalpinioideae.

Species
Denisophytum comprises the following species:
 Denisophytum bessac (Chiov. 1929) E. Gagnon & G. P. Lewis 2016
 Denisophytum buchii (Urb. 1913) E. Gagnon & G. P. Lewis 2016
 Denisophytum eriantherum (Chiov. 1929) E. Gagnon & G. P. Lewis 2016
 var. eriantherum (Chiov. 1929) E. Gagnon & G. P. Lewis 2016
 var. pubescens (Brenan) E. Gagnon & G. P. Lewis
 Denisophytum madagascariense R. Vig 1949
 Denisophytum pauciflorum (Griseb. 1866) E. Gagnon & G. P. Lewis 2016—Fewflower holdback
 Denisophytum rosei (Urb. 1918) E. Gagnon & G. P. Lewis 2016
 Denisophytum sessilifolium (S. Watson 1886) E. Gagnon & G. P. Lewis 2016
 Denisophytum stuckertii (Hassl. 1913) E. Gagnon & G. P. Lewis 2016

References

External links 

Caesalpinieae
Fabaceae genera